Carmelo Flores (born 16 December 1955) is a Puerto Rican wrestler. He competed in the men's freestyle 62 kg at the 1984 Summer Olympics.

References

1955 births
Living people
Puerto Rican male sport wrestlers
Olympic wrestlers of Puerto Rico
Wrestlers at the 1984 Summer Olympics
Place of birth missing (living people)